Hirfanlı Dam is a dam in Turkey. The development was backed by the Turkish State Hydraulic Works. It was built by Wimpey Construction and was completed in 1959.

See also

List of dams and reservoirs in Turkey

References

Sources
 

Dams in Kırşehir Province
Hydroelectric power stations in Turkey
Dams completed in 1959
Important Bird Areas of Turkey
Kızılırmak